Montbré is a commune in the Marne department in north-eastern France. The area of the commune of Montbré is 3.08 km2, and its elevation range lies between 103 and 165 m.

See also
Communes of the Marne department

References

Communes of Marne (department)